Berrak Tüzünataç (born 2 November 1984) is a Turkish actress.

Biography
Berrak Tüzünataç moved to İstanbul in 1995 with her family and attended Koç School. In 2004, she began studying Business Administration at Istanbul University. She worked as a presenter on Number One TV. She joined a model agency and took acting lessons at the BKM workshop. Tüzünataç made her acting debut in Beyza'nın Kadınları. She came to attention for playing the character "Vahide" in hit series Elveda Rumeli about Turks in Macedonia when the Ottoman Empire lost its European land.

Filmography

References

1984 births
Living people
People from Yalova
Turkish female models
Turkish film actresses
Turkish television actresses